Deborah Kay Frecklington (born 3 September 1971) is an Australian politician who is the member of the Legislative Assembly of Queensland for Nanango, having won the seat at the 2012 state election. She was the Leader of the Queensland Opposition and leader of the Liberal National Party of Queensland (LNP) before resigning as party leader following the LNP’s loss at the 2020 Queensland state election.

Early life 
Frecklington was born in Miles in south-west Queensland. She grew up on a cattle property at Guluguba and attended Guluguba State School. For her secondary schooling, she was a boarder at Ipswich Girls' Grammar School.

Frecklington has a bachelor of business (University of Southern Queensland) and a bachelor of law (Queensland University of Technology).

She has worked in the clothing, motor vehicle and newspaper industries. Her career takes in the co-management of broad-acre cropping properties with her husband. During her time as a lawyer, she worked for Kelly & Frecklington Solicitors, specialising in family and property law.

Politics 
Frecklington was appointed assistant minister for Finance, Administration and Regulatory Reform on 3 April 2012 and subsequently appointed to the role of assistant minister to the premier in June 2014. Following the LNP's defeat in 2015, she was appointed to the LNP front bench as Shadow Minister for Agriculture.

In 2016, she was elected unopposed as deputy leader of the LNP—and hence deputy leader of the opposition—after Tim Nicholls ousted Lawrence Springborg as leader.

Leader of the LNP
After Nicholls led the party to a loss at the 2017 state election, Frecklington was elected the leader of the LNP at a party-room meeting on 12 December 2017. Frecklington secured 25 votes out of a possible 39 in the first round of voting. Former leader John-Paul Langbroek received 10 votes while outsider Mark Robinson received three votes, and there was one informal vote. Frecklington became only the second female Queensland opposition leader in history, and the first woman to lead the non-Labor side in Queensland. She is also the second LNP leader from a long-held national seat; Nanango was the seat of former long-serving National Premier Joh Bjelke-Petersen, who held it and its successor seat, Barambah, from 1947 to 1987. 

Frecklington took the LNP into the 2020 Queensland state election. The LNP was heavily defeated, suffering a five-seat swing and winning only five seats in Brisbane. Frecklington initially indicated she would stay on as leader, but on 2 November announced she would call a leadership spill which she would not contest. On 12 November, David Crisafulli was elected leader.

Soon afterward, Frecklington became shadow minister for water and shadow minister for regional development in Crisafulli's shadow cabinet. She is one of the few state politicians in Australia to have never spent a day on the backbench, having spent her entire career as a junior minister (2012-2015), shadow minister (2015-2016, 2020-present), deputy opposition leader (2016-2017) and opposition leader (2017-2020).

Community interests 

Frecklington is a member of:

 The South Burnett Suicide Prevention Group
 Kingaroy Chamber of Commerce
 Toowoomba and Surat Basin Enterprise
 South Burnett Law Association

Personal life
Frecklington lives with her husband and three children in Kingaroy.

See also
Shadow ministry of Deb Frecklington

References

External links 
 
 

1971 births
Living people
Liberal National Party of Queensland politicians
Members of the Queensland Legislative Assembly
Australian solicitors
Women members of the Queensland Legislative Assembly
21st-century Australian politicians
21st-century Australian women politicians
Women deputy opposition leaders
Deputy opposition leaders